The HTC Butterfly S (stylized as the Butterfly s) is an Android smartphone designed and manufactured by HTC. It is exclusive to Asian countries and currently has not been officially released in North America or Europe. The Butterfly S was unveiled on 19 June 2013 for release in Asian markets by July 2013. It is the successor to the HTC Butterfly (known as the HTC Droid DNA when released in the United States by Verizon Wireless), and incorporates hardware and software features first introduced by the HTC One (such as Sense 5, the UltraPixel image sensor, the Zoe camera features, and dual front-facing stereo speakers), but is distinguished from the One by a larger, 5-inch 1080p display, a larger 3200 mAh battery and a Snapdragon 600 quad-core processor clocked at 1.9 GHz. The Butterfly S has a shiny plastic unibody compared to the aluminum unibody of the One, and has three capacitive buttons instead of two. It lacks the optical image stabilization of the One and the waterproofing of the original Butterfly. It has 16GB of internal storage and a microSD card slot for storage up to 64GB. The international 901s variant sold in Asian countries such as Singapore and Hong Kong has support for 4G LTE. The original Taiwanese version (901e) does not have LTE support and is currently available unlocked or on a contract with various carriers (initially only Chunghwa Telecom. An LTE version for Taiwan was announced in January 2014, following the implementation of LTE by various Taiwanese carriers. In China, two variants were released, a regular version with a 3200 mAh battery and a dual SIM version with a 2300 mAh battery. Only the Taiwanese variants officially received Android 5.0.2 Lollipop.

References

External links 

Butterfly S
Android (operating system) devices
Mobile phones introduced in 2013
Discontinued smartphones
Mobile phones with infrared transmitter